Commandant's Service was the name for the military police of some Warsaw Pact and other armies. Its principal duties were providing garrison security and traffic control. It is not to be confused with a similar organization called Traffic Regulators operated by the Transport Troops of the Rear Services.

Soviet Union/Russia

The Komendantskaya sluzhba (Russian: комендантская служба) or 'komendatura' (Ru:комендатура) in the Soviet and Russian militaries were designated by a red shield on one or both arms bearing a yellow letter "K", plain red shoulder boards and a white helmet bearing a red star and broad red circumferential stripe. These helmets were generally painted at the unit level   The komendatura are being replaced by the newly established Military Police (Ru:Военная полиция России or Voennaya politsiya or VP).

At one time the komendatura officers wore a black cloth or leather uniform with white helmets and gloves, and belts and holsters.

Bulgaria

The Commandment Service is part of the Ministry of Defence, located in Sofia and is in charge of real estate management, transportation, library services, documentation publishing and communications support for the central administration of the MoD, transportation support to the immediate MoD personnel, classified information, cryptographic, and perimeter security for the MoD administration buildings.

East Germany

The East German Army Commandant's Service was called the Kommandantendienst or KD, in addition to traffic control and military police duties it performed courier services. The Kommandantendienst wore a white stripe on their helmet and a white cross strap and belt, handgun holster and gloves.

Notes

See also
 Commandant
 Military Police
 Regimental Police
 Unit Police
 Traffic Regulator

Military police
Combat support occupations
Military law